Tamolanica phryne is a species of praying mantis in the family Mantidae.

References

Articles created by Qbugbot
Insects described in 1877